Mukwanangombe Auguste Mukwahepo Immanuel (7 October 1937 – 30 May 2018) affectionately known as Meekulu Mukwahepo was a Namibian guerrilla, notable for being the first woman recruit of the  People's Liberation Army of Namibia. Mukwahepo committed her life looking after children during the South African Border War, moving from one camp to another whenever the need arose.

In 1963 Mukwahepo left her home in Namibia and followed her fiance  Shikongo Hangala across the border into Angola. They survived hunger and war and eventually made their way to Tanzania. There, Mukwahepo became the first woman to undergo military training with SWAPO. For nine years she was the only woman in SWAPO's Kongwa camp. She was then thrust into a more traditional women's role - taking care of children in the SWAPO camps in Zambia and Angola. Mukwahepo underwent combat training in 1965 in Kongwa, Tanzania where she remained for nine years. At independence she was repatriated along with five children that she took care of in exile, according to UNAM's Ellen Ndeshi Namhila ’s book about the life of Mukwahepo; Mukwahepo : woman soldier mother

Death
Mukwahepo was accorded a State funeral in terms of article 32 (8) of the Namibian Constitution by President Hage Geingob  and  buried in Eenhana on 9 June at the Eenhana Burial Shrine after her memorial took place at the Eenhana Sports Stadium on June 08th.

The burial was attended by Prime Minister Saara Kuugongelwa-Amadhila, former president Hifikepunye Pohamba, the Deputy Prime Minister and Minister of International Relations and Cooperation, Netumbo Nandi-Ndaitwah, Speaker of the National Assembly Peter Katjavivi and the Swapo Secretary General Sophia Shaningwa as well as Vice-President Nangolo Mbumba. It was  also attended by the Consul General of Angola Fransisco Correia and Judge President Petrus Damaseb.

In 1995 President Sam Nujoma conferred on her a medal at Omugulugwombashe in recognition of her heroism and contributions to the liberation of Namibia and was given a house by Former President Pohamba while Former Prime Minister Nahas Angula brought her furnitures for her sitting room.

References

1937 births
2018 deaths
People from Ohangwena Region
SWAPO politicians
People's Liberation Army of Namibia personnel
Namibian military personnel
National heroes of Namibia